Boutique Air, Inc.  is a commuter airline based in San Francisco, California. The airline offers charter services as well as scheduled passenger services subsidized under the Essential Air Service (EAS) program. Boutique operates the second largest PC-12 fleet in the United States with 26 aircraft. In 2019, Boutique transported over 180,000 passengers.

History
The company was founded in 2007 by Shawn Simpson, an early employee of Google. It was originally an aviation technology company before it began acquiring a fleet of aircraft in 2012 through its holding company, Targaryen LLC. It operated on-demand charters, pilot training, and air patrol services for government sectors using Cessna aircraft before purchasing Pilatus PC-12 aircraft to operate its passenger charter flights.

In 2013, it received commuter air carrier authority from the United States Department of Transportation. Its first scheduled service was operated in 2013-2014 between Hawthorne Municipal Airport near Los Angeles and McCarran International Airport in Las Vegas. During that time, the company began submitting proposals to provide scheduled service to rural communities and regions under contract as part of the Essential Air Service program and began its first flights between Clovis Municipal Airport in New Mexico and Dallas/Fort Worth International Airport in July 2014. The carrier has expanded further in New Mexico to include airports in Carlsbad, Los Alamos, Albuquerque, and Silver City. By the end of 2015, it flew 14 scheduled routes with an Essential Air Service airport destination.

As of October 2022, Boutique has been removed from the Aviate program as it undergoes an investigation with the FAA.

In November 2022, Boutique Air Pilots began the unionization process after negotiations with Shawn Simpson (CEO) fell through.

Corporate affairs
The headquarters are at Suite 925 of 5 3rd Street, San Francisco.

The headquarters were previously at 340 Pine Street, and later in the Flatiron Building.

Destinations

Airline Agreements

Interline and codeshare agreements

United Airlines 
Boutique Air announced a new codeshare agreement with United Airlines on May 23, 2018. Customers can book their entire itinerary under a single reservation for through ticketing and baggage transfer to their final destination. MileagePlus members can earn miles on eligible Boutique Air flights. Since Boutique has a codeshare with United Airlines, passengers with United Club memberships can access the lounge even if they are not flying with United.

American Airlines 
In December 2018, Boutique launched a new interline agreement with American Airlines. Similar to the codeshare with United, customers can book all flights under a single reservation for flow through ticketing and baggage transfers to their final destination.

United Aviate 
In 2020, United Airlines launched a flow-through program called United Aviate.  Boutique Air pilots can enter the Aviate Experience Build Entry Point. Pilots undergo an evaluation that includes employment history, panel interviews, technical skill inventory and a personality and cultural fit inventory. Once accepted into the program, pilots will have access to travel privileges, site tours, development events, coaching, United leadership interaction, and a direct path to United Airlines. When the applicant has earned their ATP certificate, they can transition to one of the United Express Aviate partners. The choices include CommutAir and Mesa Airlines. Once the minimum service requirements with United Express are met, the applicant will be eligible to transition to a First Officer position with United. As of October 2022, Boutique Air has been removed from the Aviate program.

Boutique Car 
In 2017, Boutique started a new rental car service called 'Boutique Car'. This service provides ground transportation options for communities that have no other options and complements Boutique's EAS proposals. Two locations currently utilize this service:

 Carlsbad, New Mexico
 Pendleton, Oregon

Fleet

Boutique Air operates the following fleet:

Accidents and incidents

References

External links
 

Airlines based in California
Airlines established in 2007
2007 establishments in California
American companies established in 2007
Companies based in San Francisco
Regional airlines of the United States